Halsted is an 'L' station on the CTA Green Line's Englewood branch, located in the Englewood neighborhood. It is situated at 6321 South Halsted Street. It opened on December 24, 1906.

Station layout
The station has two side platforms and a single entrance on the east side of Halsted Street. The entrance contains turnstiles and a staircase and elevator reaching each platform as well as an escalator to the Harlem-bound platform. At the east end of each platform is an exit-only staircase.

Bus connections 
CTA
8 Halsted
63 63rd (Owl Service)

References

External links
Halsted (Englewood Line) Station Page at Chicago-L.org
Halsted Street entrance from Google Maps Street View

CTA Green Line stations
Railway stations in the United States opened in 1906